Two University Boat Races took place in 1849:
March 1849
December 1849